The Electoral district of Keilor was a metropolitan electorate approximately 15 kilometres north-west of Melbourne, Australia in Victoria's Legislative Assembly.

The Keilor District covered an area of 70 square kilometres, including the suburbs of Hillside, Keilor Downs, Keilor Lodge, Taylors Hill and Sydenham and parts of the suburbs of Caroline Springs, Keilor and Plumpton.

It was abolished in 2014 and replaced by Sydenham.

Members for Keilor

Election results

See also
 Parliaments of the Australian states and territories
 List of members of the Victorian Legislative Assembly

External links
Electorate profile: Keilor District, Victorian Electoral Commission

References

1976 establishments in Australia
2014 disestablishments in Australia
Former electoral districts of Victoria (Australia)